RDMS may refer to:
 Registered Diagnostic Medical Sonographer, a credential imparted by the American Registry for Diagnostic Medical Sonography
 An alternative abbreviation for Relational database management system, usually RDBMS